Comin' Home is an album by guitarist Larry Coryell which was recorded in 1984 and released on the Muse label.

Reception

The AllMusic review by Scott Yanow stated "This is one of guitarist Larry Coryell's most straight-ahead sets, a bop-flavored session recorded in one day with a fine quartet that had just played a week at the Village Vanguard. ... Throughout, Larry Coryell shows that he could have been a top bop stylist if he had wanted to pursue that direction, instead of his more innovative and eclectic path".

Track listing
All compositions by Larry Coryell except where noted
 "Good Citizen Swallow" – 6:08
 "Glorielle" – 7:52
 "Twelve and Twelve" – 4:53
 "No More Booze, Minor Blues" – 7:32
 "Confirmation" (Charlie Parker) – 6:14
 "It Never Entered My Mind" (Richard Rodgers, Lorenz Hart) – 4:25

Personnel
Larry Coryell – guitar
Albert Dailey – piano 
George Mraz – bass 
Billy Hart – drums
Julie Coryell – track 6 vocals

References

Muse Records albums
Larry Coryell albums
1984 albums
Albums recorded at Van Gelder Studio
Albums produced by Michael Cuscuna